Major Philip Percy Kenyon-Slaney   (12 February 1896 – 9 September 1928) was a British Conservative Party politician.

Kenyon-Slaney was son of Percy Kenyon-Slaney (1861–1911) and his wife, Geraldine Ellen Georgina, daughter of the Reverend George William Whitmore, who had made their home at Langworthy, Devon.  His uncle Colonel William Kenyon-Slaney had also been a Member of Parliament.

He was educated at Bradfield School.

Throughout the First World War he served with Royal North Devon Yeomanry, Royal Field Artillery, seeing action on the Western Front.  He was mentioned in despatches and awarded the Military Cross in the 1916 Birthday Honours. He was gassed several times, subsequently affecting his health. After the war he was on the Territorial Army Reserve of Officers with the rank of Major.

He was elected at the 1924 general election as Member of Parliament (MP) for the Tavistock division of Devon, and held the seat until his death, in a Torquay nursing home, in 1928, aged 32.

His health had caused him to announce he would not stand at the next General Election. His last home was at Beechwood House, Plympton, Devon.

References

External links 
 

1896 births
1928 deaths
Conservative Party (UK) MPs for English constituencies
UK MPs 1924–1929
Recipients of the Military Cross
British Army personnel of World War I
Members of the Parliament of the United Kingdom for Tavistock
Royal North Devon Yeomanry officers
Royal Field Artillery officers